Group B of the 2002 Fed Cup Americas Zone Group II was one of two pools in the Americas Zone Group II of the 2002 Fed Cup. Six teams competed in a round robin competition, with the top team advancing to Group I in 2003.

Cuba vs. Trinidad and Tobago

Eastern Caribbean vs. Jamaica

Costa Rica vs. Guatemala

Cuba vs. Guatemala

Jamaica vs. Costa Rica

Eastern Caribbean vs. Trinidad and Tobago

Cuba vs. Costa Rica

Jamaica vs. Trinidad and Tobago

Eastern Caribbean vs. Guatemala

Eastern Caribbean vs. Cuba

Jamaica vs. Guatemala

Costa Rica vs. Trinidad and Tobago

Cuba vs. Jamaica

Eastern Caribbean vs. Costa Rica

Guatemala vs. Trinidad and Tobago

  placed first in the pool, and thus advanced to Group I in 2003, where they placed third in their pool of four.

See also
Fed Cup structure

References

External links
 Fed Cup website

2002 Fed Cup Americas Zone